Todi is one of the ten basic thaats of Hindustani music from the Indian subcontinent. It is also the name of a raga within this thaat.

Description
Todi has Komal Rishab, Gandhar, and Dhaivat, as well as Teevra Madhyam. The Todi raga represents the mood of delighted adoration with a gentle, loving sentiment and it's traditionally performed in the late morning.

Ragas
Ragas in Todi Thaat:
Miyan Ki Todi/Todi/Darbari Todi
Gujari Todi
Madhuvanti
Multani

References

Hindustani music theory